The Mayfair Inn Open was a PGA Tour event that was played for four years in the 1950s. The Mayfair Inn was a 155-room resort hotel on the shores of Lake Monroe in Sanford, Florida known for its opulence and isolation. The PGA Tour event was played in mid-December from 1955–1958 at the Mayfair Country Club, some distance from the hotel. Total prize money was $15,000. The hotel closed in the early 1960s.

Winners

References

Former PGA Tour events
Golf in Florida